is a Japanese former boxer. He competed in the men's flyweight event at the 1952 Summer Olympics. At the 1952 Summer Olympics, he lost to Mircea Dobrescu of Romania.

References

External links
 

1929 births
Possibly living people
Japanese male boxers
Olympic boxers of Japan
Boxers at the 1952 Summer Olympics
Place of birth missing (living people)
Flyweight boxers
20th-century Japanese people